Communications in Vietnam include the use of telephones, radio, television and Internet.

Telephones
Vietnam is putting considerable effort into modernization and expansion of its telecommunication system. Domestically, all provincial exchanges are digitalized and connected to Hanoi, Da Nang and Ho Chi Minh City by fiber optic cable or microwave radio relay networks. Main lines have been substantially increased, and the use of mobile telephones is growing rapidly. As of 2012, there were 134 million mobile phone subscribers, making Vietnam's rank 6th in the world.

Two satellite earth stations are in use: Intersputnik (Indian Ocean region).

The incumbent operator is the Vietnam Posts and Telecommunications Group, which spun off from the Department General of Posts and Telecommunications after the separation of regulatory and commercial functions of the latter in 1990. Following the creation of a separate regulatory entity, market segments were opened to competition, starting with mobile services in 1995. The international services market, considered the most lucrative, was opened to other providers in 2000.

Mobile networks
Viettel Mobile (directly under Viettel Corp.): 032, 033, 034, 035, 036, 037, 038, 039, 096, 097, 098
MobiFone (directly under VMS): 070, 076, 077, 078, 079, 089, 090, 093
VinaPhone (directly under VNPT): 081, 082, 083, 084, 085, 086, 088, 091, 094
S-Fone (directly under CDMA S-Telecom): 095
Vietnamobile (ex-HT Mobile): 092, 052, 056, 058
Beeline (directly under G-Tel): 059, 099

At the beginning of 2013, S-Fone and Beeline services are temporarily shut down due to hard competitions with other mobile operators. Beeline, a mobile operator found by Global Telecommunications Corporation or G-Tel and VimpelCom came to the market in 2009. A company with cooperation between companies from Vietnam and Russia ended its service by the end of the year 2012 as a result of G-Tel became the owner of Beeline after VimpelCom sold all stocks to its partner. Earlier in 2010, SK Telecom decided to pull out of the Vietnam mobile market when stopping cooperation with SPT - Saigon Postel Corp. in S-Fone.

Broadcast media
The government controls all broadcast media exercising oversight through the Ministry of Information and Communication.  The government-controlled national TV provider, Vietnam Television, operates a network of 9 channels with several regional broadcasting centers.  The programming is relayed nationwide via a network of provincial and municipal TV stations.  Vietnam law limits access to satellite TV, but many households are able to access foreign programming via home satellite equipment.

Broadcast stations: six (plus 61 provincial TV stations) (as of 2006)

Internet

Although basic Internet services had existed in Vietnam since the early nineties, the first commercial Internet Service Provider (ISP) opened for business in 1997. Since 1997 Vietnam has been connected by two gateways: one in Hanoi which connects with Hong Kong and Australia, and the other in Ho Chi Minh City, which connects with the United States by Sprint.

Vietnam ranks 16th in the world in terms of number of internet users, far above any of its neighboring SE Asian nations.

There are five ISPs operating: Netnam Company, Vietnam Data Communication Company (VDC), Corporation for Finance and Promoting Technology (FPT),  Saigon Post and Telecommunications Services Corporation (Saigon Postel Corporation, SPT) and Viettel Company. In the large cities, fiber service is widely available.

Statistics

See also
Media of Vietnam
Vietnam Multimedia Corporation
Vietnam Television

References

External links

Resources
Statistics